The 2010 Novilon Eurocup Ronde van Drenthe was the 12th running of the Damesronde van Drenthe, a women's bicycle race in Drenthe, the Netherlands. It was rated by the UCI as a 1.1 category race.

Results

Source

References

External links
  

Ronde van Drenthe (women's race)
2010 in Dutch sport
2010 in women's road cycling